Oberea bimaculicollis is a species of flat-faced longhorn beetle in the tribe Saperdini in the genus Oberea, discovered by Breuning in 1961.

References

B
Beetles described in 1961